The Rose City Wildcats were a women's professional American football team based in Portland, Oregon.  A member of the Women's Spring Football League, the Wildcats were planning on playing in the league's second season in 2011.

The Wildcats are named to honor (though not a continuation of) a team which played in the Women's American Football League for the 2001 season, finishing 0-7 before shutting down.

American football teams in Portland, Oregon
Sports teams in Portland, Oregon
Women's Spring Football League teams
2010 establishments in Oregon
2010 disestablishments in Oregon
Defunct American football teams in Oregon
Women's sports in Oregon
American football teams established in 2010
American football teams disestablished in 2010